Monika, Baroness van Paemel (born 4 May 1945) is a Belgian writer. Born in Poesele, at age 14 she attended the Heilig Graf boarding school in Turnhout, where she graduated in commercial sciences. In 1963, she married Theo Butsen, whom she divorced some years later. Together they had two daughters, but one of them died aged seventeen.

On 16 July 1993, she was knighted and became a baroness.

Bibliography

 Amazone met het blauwe voorhoofd (1971)
 De confrontatie (1974)
 Marguerite (1976)
 De vermaledijde vaders (1985)
 De eerste steen (1988)
 Het wedervaren (1993)
 Rozen op ijs (1997)
 Het verschil (2000)
 Celestien, de gebenedijde moeders(2004)
 Te zot of te bot (2006)
 De koningin van Sheba (2008)
 Het gezin van Puynbroeckx (2008)
 Weduwenspek (2013)

Awards
 1972 - Prijs voor het beste literair debuut
 1973 - Literaire prijs voor letterkunde Oost-Vlaanderen
 1986 - Dirk Martens prijs
 1986 - Prijs van de Vlaamse provincies

See also
 Flemish literature

References

External links
 Monika van Paemel
 Willem M. Roggeman, Monika van Paemel In: Beroepsgeheim 6 (1992)

1945 births
Flemish writers
Belgian women writers
Living people
Flemish women writers